The Roman Catholic Diocese of Pemba is a diocese located in the city of Pemba in the Ecclesiastical province of Nampula in Mozambique.

History
 April 5, 1957: Established as Diocese of Porto Amélia from the Diocese of Nampula
 September 17, 1976: Renamed as Diocese of Pemba

Leadership
 Bishops of Porto Amélia (Latin Church)
 Bishop José dos Santos Garcia, S.M.P. (1957.04.05 – 1975.01.15)
 Bishop Januário Machaze Nhangumbe (1975.01.15 – 1976.09.17 see below)
 Bishops of Pemba (Latin Church)
 Bishop Januário Machaze Nhangumbe (see above 1976.09.17 – 1993.11.08)
 Bishop Tomé Makhweliha, S.C.I. (1997.10.24 – 2000.11.16), appointed Archbishop of Nampula
 Bishop Francisco Chimoio, O.F.M. Cap. (2000.12.05 – 2003.02.22), appointed Archbishop of Maputo
 Bishop Ernesto Maguengue (2004.06.24 – 2012.10.27), resigned; later appointed auxiliary bishop of Nampula
 Bishop Luiz Fernando Lisboa (2013.03.12 – 2021.02.11), appointed Archbishop (Personal Title) of Cachoeiro do Itapemirim
 Bishop António Juliasse Ferreira Sandramo (2022.03.08 – ...)

Persecution and insecurity 
In October 2017 suspected Islamic militants began a terror campaign insurgency in Cabo Delgado, Diocese of Pemba. The Jihadists were later confirmed to be linked to Ansar al-Sunna, which is under the umbrella of the Islamic State. The bishop at the time was Luiz Fernando Lisboa, who spoke out often about the violence, denouncing both the terrorists and the regime's response. The bishop met personally with Pope Francis to discuss the issue and in an interview with Portuguese media outlet Renascença he later confirmed that he had left Mozambique abruptly, being transferred to his native Brazil, because he had received credible death threats from the Government. 

The new bishop, António Juliasse Ferreira Sandramo, has also spoken about the violence, and has said that the Church wants to be part of the solution, but has not been approached by the Government to help in any way until now. "The whole of society has to be involved, and that includes the Church, which can contribute to the promotion of peace and stability for the country. We do what we can to spread love and peace to everyone, and we have been having meetings with other religious leaders, Christians and Muslims. We have not yet been officially approached for cooperation, but we have much to contribute, the Church has experience in this field that could be very useful". He also criticised the Government for relying only on military force to quell the insurgency. "As we bishops, and other members of civil society, have been saying, the military solution is not the only one, because most of these young terrorists are local boys. Some might come from abroad, but most of them are Mozambican, they come from the villages, they know the terrain. This makes it easy for them to hide, they watch the armed forces and only attack when they are far away".

In an interview with Aid to the Church in Need, in June 2022, Bishop António Juliasse spoke about the gravity of the situation and how it was affecting pastoral work. "We have parishes that have been practically destroyed, priests who are living in difficult situations because they had to abandon their missions empty-handed; children, elderly people and others are in great need, and we can’t handle it by ourselves."

So far the violence has caused around 4000 deaths and over 800 thousand internally displaced people, the majority of which in the Diocese of Pemba, and the Church has been heavily involved in providing humanitarian relief.

See also
Roman Catholicism in Mozambique

References

Sources
 GCatholic.org
 Catholic Hierarchy

Pemba
Christian organizations established in 1957
Roman Catholic dioceses and prelatures established in the 20th century
1957 establishments in Mozambique
Roman Catholic Ecclesiastical Province of Nampula